Qalkhani Rural District is a rural district (dehestan) in Gahvareh District, Dalahu County, Kermanshah Province, Iran. At the 2006 census, its population was 9,354, in 1,954 families. The rural district has 53 villages.

References 

Rural Districts of Kermanshah Province
Dalahu County